Agathomerus is a genus of beetles in the family Megalopodidae, containing the following species:

 Subgenus Agathomeroides Monrós, 1947
 Agathomerus flavomaculatus (Klug, 1824)
 Subgenus Agathomerus Lacordaire, 1845
 Agathomerus affinis Jacoby, 1880
 Agathomerus atripennis Jacoby, 1880
 Agathomerus atripes Pic, 1947
 Agathomerus azureipennis Lacordaire, 1845
 Agathomerus basalis Pic, 1916
 Agathomerus batesi Baly, 1859
 Agathomerus bichito Monrós, 1945
 Agathomerus bifasciatus (Klug, 1824)
 Agathomerus bivittatus Lacordaire, 1845
 Agathomerus coeruleus Bates, 1866
 Agathomerus cyaneus Clark, 1845
 Agathomerus cyanopterus Lacordaire, 1845
 Agathomerus discoideus (Klug, 1824)
 Agathomerus dubiosus Jacoby, 1876
 Agathomerus egregius (Germar, 1823)
 Agathomerus ephippium Lacordaire, 1845
 Agathomerus fasciatus (Dalman, 1823)
 Agathomerus freudi Guérin-Méneville, 1852
 Agathomerus hahneli Pic, 1955
 Agathomerus inapicalis Pic, 1955
 Agathomerus incomparabilis Clark, 1866
 Agathomerus interrupta Pic, 1947
 Agathomerus lautus Bates, 1866
 Agathomerus lemoulti Pic, 1916
 Agathomerus lineatus Guérin-Méneville, 1852
 Agathomerus luteoreductus Pic, 1955
 Agathomerus monrosi Pic, 1947
 Agathomerus nicki Guérin, 1948
 Agathomerus nigricollis Clark, 1866
 Agathomerus nobilis (Klug, 1834)
 Agathomerus notaticollis Clark, 1866
 Agathomerus obliterata Pic, 1947
 Agathomerus pauper Bates, 1866
 Agathomerus pictus Lacordaire, 1845
 Agathomerus postmaculatus Pic, 1955
 Agathomerus pulcher Lacordaire, 1845
 Agathomerus rubrinotatus Clark, 1866
 Agathomerus rufus (Klug, 1834)
 Agathomerus sallei Baly, 1859
 Agathomerus sexmaculatus (Kirby, 1818)
 Agathomerus signatus (Klug, 1824)
 Agathomerus simplicipennis Jacoby, 1880
 Agathomerus succinctus (Klug, 1834)
 Agathomerus superbus Pic, 1916
 Agathomerus testaceus (Klug, 1824)
 Agathomerus viduus Clark, 1866
 Agathomerus zikani Guérin, 1951
 Subgenus Euagathomerus Monrós, 1947
 Agathomerus elegans (Klug, 1834)
 Agathomerus marginatus (Klug, 1824)
 Agathomerus sellatus (Germar, 1824)
 Subgenus Longathomerus Pic, 1947
 Agathomerus humeralis (Serville, 1825)
 Subgenus Mesagathomerus Monrós, 1947
 Agathomerus quadrimaculatus (Guérin, 1945)
 Subgenus Trichagathomerus Monrós, 1947
 Agathomerus subfasciatus (Germar, 1823)

References

Megalopodidae genera
Taxa named by Jean Théodore Lacordaire